Anne Devlin (born 13 September 1951) is a short story writer, playwright and screenwriter born in Belfast, Northern Ireland. She was a teacher from 1974 to 1978, and started writing fiction in 1976 in Germany. Having lived in London for a decade, she returned to Belfast in 2007.

She is the daughter of Paddy Devlin, a Northern Ireland Labour Party (NILP) Member of the Parliament of Northern Ireland and later a founding member of the Social Democratic and Labour Party (SDLP). She was raised in Belfast. In January 1969, while a student at the New University of Ulster, Devlin joined a civil rights march from Belfast to Derry, organised by the People's Democracy. At Burntollet Bridge, a few miles from Derry, the march was attacked by loyalists. Devlin was struck on the head, knocked unconscious, fell into the river, and was brought to hospital suffering from concussion. The march was echoed in her 1994 play After Easter. Devlin subsequently left Northern Ireland for England. She was visiting lecturer in playwriting at the University of Birmingham in 1987, and a writer in residence at Lund University, Sweden, in 1990.

Publications
 1988 - The Rainbow
 1992 - Wuthering Heights
 1999 - Titanic Town (Faber & Faber)

Awards
 1992 - Hennessy Literary Award for short stories 
 1985 - Samuel Beckett Award for TV Drama

References

Alumni of Ulster University
1951 births
20th-century writers from Northern Ireland
21st-century writers from Northern Ireland
Living people
Writers from Belfast
Screenwriters from Northern Ireland
Women short story writers from Northern Ireland
Women writers from Northern Ireland
British women screenwriters
20th-century Irish dramatists and playwrights
Women dramatists and playwrights from Northern Ireland
British women short story writers
Television writers from Northern Ireland
20th-century British dramatists and playwrights
20th-century Irish women writers
21st-century Irish women writers
British women television writers